John Cygan (April 27, 1954 – May 13, 2017) was an American actor and comedian.

Early life
Cygan was born in New York City to a large family of thirteen children, six of them were half-siblings. His parents never married.

He attended West Babylon High School on Long Island and was active in church and school theatre while in high school, including a star performance as the insane brother in Arsenic and Old Lace and the lead performance in a high school production of Bye Bye Birdie, as the ever faithful agent Albert Peterson.

Career
Cygan was notable for his television work (The Commish, The X-Files) and his voice work (Star Wars games, Metal Gear Solid 2: Sons of Liberty, SOCOM U.S. Navy SEALs: Fireteam Bravo games).

Death
Cygan died of cancer at his home in Woodland Hills, Los Angeles, on May 13, 2017, at the age of 63. He is survived by his wife and two children, Annie and Jack.

Filmography

Film

Television

Video games

References

External links
 
 
 John Cygan at Find a Grave

1954 births
2017 deaths
American male voice actors
American male comedians
Male actors from New York City
American male film actors
American male television actors
American male video game actors
Comedians from New York City
Deaths from cancer in California